SCDSB may refer to:

 Simcoe County District School Board, Ontario, Canada
 Sudbury Catholic District School Board, Ontario, Canada